

Events

Pre-1600
1076 – Having received a letter during the Lenten synod of 14–20 February demanding that he abdicate, Pope Gregory VII excommunicates Henry IV, Holy Roman Emperor.
1316 – The Battle of Picotin, between Ferdinand of Majorca and the forces of Matilda of Hainaut, ends in victory for Ferdinand.
1371 – Robert II becomes King of Scotland, beginning the Stuart dynasty.
1495 – King Charles VIII of France enters Naples to claim the city's throne.

1601–1900
1632 – Ferdinando II de' Medici, Grand Duke of Tuscany, the dedicatee, receives the first printed copy of Galileo's Dialogue Concerning the Two Chief World Systems.
1651 – St. Peter's Flood: A storm surge floods the Frisian coast, drowning 15,000 people.
1744 – War of the Austrian Succession: The Battle of Toulon causes several Royal Navy captains to be court-martialed, and the Articles of War to be amended.
1797 – The last Invasion of Britain begins near Fishguard, Wales.
1819 – By the Adams–Onís Treaty, Spain sells Florida to the United States for five million U.S. dollars.
1847 – Mexican–American War: The Battle of Buena Vista: Five thousand American troops defeat 15,000 Mexican troops.
1848 – The French Revolution of 1848, which would lead to the establishment of the French Second Republic, begins.
1856 – The United States Republican Party opens its first national convention in Pittsburgh.
1862 – American Civil War: Jefferson Davis is officially inaugurated for a six-year term as the President of the Confederate States of America in Richmond, Virginia. He was previously inaugurated as a provisional president on February 18, 1861.
1872 – The Prohibition Party holds its first national convention in Columbus, Ohio, nominating James Black as its presidential nominee.
1879 – In Utica, New York, Frank Woolworth opens the first of many of five-and-dime Woolworth stores.
1881 – Cleopatra's Needle, a 3,500-year-old Ancient Egyptian obelisk is erected in Central Park, New York. 
1889 – President Grover Cleveland signs a bill admitting North Dakota, South Dakota, Montana and Washington as U.S. states.
1899 – Filipino forces led by General Antonio Luna launch counterattacks for the first time against the American forces during the Philippine–American War. The Filipinos fail to regain Manila from the Americans.

1901–present
1904 – The United Kingdom sells a meteorological station on the South Orkney Islands to Argentina; the islands are subsequently claimed by the United Kingdom in 1908.
1921 – After Russian forces under Baron Roman von Ungern-Sternberg drive the Chinese out, the Bogd Khan is reinstalled as the emperor of Mongolia.
1942 – World War II: President Franklin D. Roosevelt orders General Douglas MacArthur out of the Philippines as the Japanese victory becomes inevitable.
1943 – World War II: Members of the White Rose resistance, Sophie Scholl, Hans Scholl, and Christoph Probst are executed in Nazi Germany.
1944 – World War II: American aircraft mistakenly bomb the Dutch towns of Nijmegen, Arnhem, Enschede and Deventer, resulting in 800 dead in Nijmegen alone.
  1944   – World War II: The Soviet Red Army recaptures Krivoi Rog.
1946 – The "Long Telegram", proposing how the United States should deal with the Soviet Union, arrives from the US embassy in Moscow.
1957 – Ngô Đình Diệm of South Vietnam survives a communist shooting assassination attempt in Buôn Ma Thuột.
1958 – Following a plebiscite in both countries the previous day, Egypt and Syria join to form the United Arab Republic.
1959 – Lee Petty wins the first Daytona 500.
1972 – The Official Irish Republican Army detonates a car bomb at Aldershot barracks, killing seven and injuring nineteen others.
1973 – Cold War: Following President Richard Nixon's visit to the People's Republic of China, the two countries agree to establish liaison offices.
1974 – The Organisation of the Islamic Conference summit begins in Lahore, Pakistan. Thirty-seven countries attend and twenty-two heads of state and government participate. It also recognizes Bangladesh.
  1974   – Samuel Byck attempts to hijack an aircraft at Baltimore/Washington International Airport with the intention of crashing it into the White House to assassinate Richard Nixon, but is killed by police.
1979 – Saint Lucia gains independence from the United Kingdom.
1980 – Miracle on Ice: In Lake Placid, New York, the United States hockey team defeats the Soviet Union hockey team 4–3.
1983 – The notorious Broadway flop Moose Murders opens and closes on the same night at the Eugene O'Neill Theatre.
1986 – Start of the People Power Revolution in the Philippines.
1994 – Aldrich Ames and his wife are charged by the United States Department of Justice with spying for the Soviet Union.
1995 – The Corona reconnaissance satellite program, in existence from 1959 to 1972, is declassified. 
1997 – In Roslin, Midlothian, British scientists announce that an adult sheep named Dolly has been successfully cloned.
2002 – Angolan political and rebel leader Jonas Savimbi is killed in a military ambush.
2005 – The 6.4  Zarand earthquake shakes the Kerman Province of Iran with a maximum Mercalli intensity of VIII (Severe), leaving 612 people dead and 1,411 injured.
 2006 – At approximately 6:44 a.m.  local Iraqi time, explosions occurred at the al-Askari Shrine in Samarra, Iraq. The attack on the shrine, one of the holiest sites in Shia Islam, caused the escalation of sectarian tensions in Iraq into a full-scale civil war.
2006 – At least six men stage Britain's biggest robbery, stealing £53m (about $92.5 million or €78 million) from a Securitas depot in Tonbridge, Kent.
2011 – New Zealand's second deadliest earthquake strikes Christchurch, killing 185 people.
  2011   – Bahraini uprising: Tens of thousands of people march in protest against the deaths of seven victims killed by police and army forces during previous protests.
2012 – A train crash in Buenos Aires, Argentina, kills 51 people and injures 700 others.
2014 – President Viktor Yanukovych of Ukraine is impeached by the Verkhovna Rada of Ukraine by a vote of 328–0, fulfilling a major goal of the Euromaidan rebellion.
2015 – A ferry carrying 100 passengers capsizes in the Padma River, killing 70 people.
2018 – A man throws a grenade at the U.S embassy in Podgorica, Montenegro. He dies at the scene from a second explosion, with no one else hurt.

Births

Pre-1600
1040 – Rashi, French rabbi and author (d. 1105)
1302 – Gegeen Khan, Emperor Yingzong of Yuan (d. 1323)
1403 – Charles VII of France (d. 1461)
1440 – Ladislaus the Posthumous, Hungarian king (d. 1457)
1500 – Rodolfo Pio da Carpi, Italian cardinal (d. 1564)
1514 – Tahmasp I, Iranian shah (d. 1576)
1520 – Moses Isserles, Polish rabbi (d. 1572)
1550 – Charles de Ligne, 2nd Prince of Arenberg (d. 1616)
1592 – Nicholas Ferrar, English scholar (d. 1637)

1601–1900
1631 – Peder Syv, Danish historian (d. 1702)
1649 – Bon Boullogne, French painter (d. 1717)
1715 – Charles-Nicolas Cochin, French artist (d. 1790)
1732 – George Washington, American general and politician, 1st President of the United States (d. 1799)
1749 – Johann Nikolaus Forkel, German musicologist and theorist (d. 1818)
1778 – Rembrandt Peale, American painter and curator (d. 1860)
1788 – Arthur Schopenhauer, German philosopher and author (d. 1860)
1796 – Alexis Bachelot, French priest and missionary (d. 1837)
  1796   – Adolphe Quetelet, Belgian mathematician, astronomer, and sociologist (d. 1874)
1805 – Sarah Fuller Flower Adams, English poet and hymnwriter (d. 1848)
1806 – Józef Kremer, Polish historian and philosopher (d. 1875)
1817 – Carl Wilhelm Borchardt, German mathematician and academic (d. 1880)
1819 – James Russell Lowell, American poet and critic (d. 1891)
1824 – Pierre Janssen, French astronomer and mathematician (d. 1907)
1825 – Jean-Baptiste Salpointe, French-American archbishop (d. 1898)
1836 – Mahesh Chandra Nyayratna Bhattacharyya, Indian scholar and academic (d. 1906)
1840 – August Bebel, German theorist and politician (d. 1913)
1849 – Nikolay Yakovlevich Sonin, Russian mathematician and academic (d. 1915)
1857 – Robert Baden-Powell, 1st Baron Baden-Powell, English general, co-founded The Scout Association (d. 1941)
  1857   – Heinrich Hertz, German physicist, philosopher, and academic (d. 1894)
1860 – Mary W. Bacheler, American physician and Baptist medical missionary (d. 1939)
1863 – Charles McLean Andrews, American historian, author, and academic (d. 1943)
1864 – Jules Renard, French author and playwright (d. 1910)
1876 – Zitkala-Sa, American author and activist (d. 1938)
1874 – Bill Klem, American baseball player and umpire (d. 1951)
1879 – Johannes Nicolaus Brønsted, Danish chemist and academic (d. 1947)
1880 – Eric Lemming, Swedish athlete (d. 1930)
1881 – Joseph B. Ely, American lawyer and politician, 52nd Governor of Massachusetts (d. 1956)
  1881   – Albin Prepeluh, Slovenian journalist and politician (d. 1937)
1882 – Eric Gill, English sculptor and illustrator (d. 1940)
1883 – Marguerite Clark, American actress (d. 1940)
1886 – Hugo Ball, German author and poet (d. 1927)
1887 – Savielly Tartakower, Polish journalist, author, and chess player (d. 1956)
  1887   – Pat Sullivan, Australian-American animator and producer (d. 1933)
1888 – Owen Brewster, American captain and politician, 54th Governor of Maine (d. 1961)
1889 – Olave Baden-Powell, English scout leader, first World Chief Guide (d. 1977)
  1889   – R. G. Collingwood, English historian and philosopher (d. 1943)
1891 – Vlas Chubar, Russian economist and politician (d. 1939)
1892 – Edna St. Vincent Millay, American poet and playwright (d. 1950)
1895 – Víctor Raúl Haya de la Torre, Peruvian politician (d. 1979)
1897 – Karol Świerczewski, Polish general (d. 1947)
1899 – George O'Hara, American actor and screenwriter (d. 1966)
1900 – Luis Buñuel, Spanish-Mexican director and producer (d. 1983)

1901–present
1903 – Morley Callaghan, Canadian author and playwright (d. 1990)
  1903   – Frank P. Ramsey, English economist, mathematician, and philosopher (d. 1930)
1906 – Constance Stokes, Australian painter (d. 1991)
1907 – Sheldon Leonard, American actor, director, and producer (d. 1997)
  1907   – Robert Young, American actor (d. 1998)
1908 – Rómulo Betancourt, Venezuelan politician, 56th President of Venezuela (d. 1981)
  1908   – John Mills, English actor (d. 2005)
1910 – George Hunt, English international footballer (d. 1996)
1914 – Renato Dulbecco, Italian-American virologist and academic, Nobel Prize laureate (d. 2012)
1915 – Gus Lesnevich, American boxer (d. 1964)
1918 – Sid Abel, Canadian-American ice hockey player, coach, and manager (d. 2000)
  1918   – Don Pardo, American radio and television announcer (d. 2014)
  1918   – Robert Wadlow, American man, the tallest person in recorded history (d. 1940)
1921 – Jean-Bédel Bokassa, Central African general and politician, 2nd President of the Central African Republic (d. 1996)
  1921 – Giulietta Masina, Italian actress (d. 1994)
1921 – Marshall Teague, American race car driver (d. 1959)
  1922 – Joe Wilder, American trumpet player, composer, and bandleader (d. 2014)
1923 – Bleddyn Williams, Welsh rugby player and sportscaster (d. 2009)
  1923   – François Cavanna,  French author and editor (d. 2014)
1925 – Edward Gorey, American illustrator and poet (d. 2000)
  1925   – Gerald Stern, American poet and academic (d. 2022)
1926 – Kenneth Williams, English actor and screenwriter (d. 1988)
1927 – Florencio Campomanes, Filipino political scientist and chess player (d. 2010)
  1927   – Guy Mitchell, American singer (d. 1999)
1928 – Clarence 13X, American religious leader, founded the Nation of Gods and Earths (d. 1969)
  1928   – Texas Johnny Brown, American singer-songwriter and guitarist (d. 2013)
  1928   – Paul Dooley, American actor
  1928   – Bruce Forsyth, English singer and television host (d. 2017) 
1929 – James Hong, American actor and director
  1929   – Rebecca Schull, American stage, film, and television actress
1930 – Marni Nixon, American soprano and actress (d. 2016) 
1932 – Ted Kennedy, American soldier, lawyer, and politician (d. 2009)
  1932   – Zenaida Manfugás, Cuban-born American-naturalized pianist (d. 2012)
1933 – Katharine, Duchess of Kent
  1933   – Sheila Hancock, English actress and author
  1933   – Ernie K-Doe, American R&B singer (d. 2001)
  1933   – Bobby Smith, English international footballer (d. 2010)
1934 – Sparky Anderson, American baseball player and manager (d. 2010)
1936 – J. Michael Bishop, American microbiologist and immunologist, Nobel Prize laureate
1937 – Tommy Aaron, American golfer
  1937   – Joanna Russ, American author and activist (d. 2011)
1938 – Steve Barber, American baseball player (d. 2007)
  1938   – Tony Macedo, Gibraltarian born English footballer
  1938   – Ishmael Reed, American poet, novelist, essayist 
1940 – Judy Cornwell, English actress
  1940   – Chet Walker, American basketball player
1941 – Hipólito Mejía, Dominican politician, 52nd President of the Dominican Republic
1942 – Christine Keeler, English model and dancer (d. 2017)
1943 – Terry Eagleton, English philosopher and critic
  1943   – Horst Köhler, Polish-German economist and politician, 9th President of Germany
  1943   – Dick Van Arsdale, American basketball player
  1943   – Tom Van Arsdale, American basketball player
  1943   – Otoya Yamaguchi, Japanese assassin of Inejiro Asanuma (d. 1960)
1944 – Jonathan Demme, American director, producer, and screenwriter (d. 2017)
  1944   – Mick Green, English guitarist (d. 2010)
  1944   – Robert Kardashian, American lawyer and businessman (d. 2003)
  1944   – Christopher Meyer, English diplomat, British Ambassador to the United States
  1944   – Tom Okker, Dutch tennis player and painter
1945 – Oliver, American pop singer (d. 2000)
1946 – Kresten Bjerre, Danish footballer and manager (d. 2014)
1947 – Pirjo Honkasalo, Finnish director, cinematographer, and screenwriter
  1947   – Harvey Mason, American drummer 
  1947   – John Radford, English footballer and manager
  1947   – Frank Van Dun, Belgian philosopher and theorist
1949 – John Duncan, Scottish footballer and manager (d. 2022)
  1949   – Niki Lauda, Austrian racing driver (d. 2019)
  1949   – Olga Morozova, Russian tennis player and coach  
1950 – Julius Erving, American basketball player and sportscaster
  1950   – Lenny Kuhr, Dutch singer-songwriter
  1950   – Miou-Miou, French actress
  1950   – Genesis P-Orridge, English singer-songwriter (d. 2020)
  1950   – Julie Walters, English actress and author
1951 – Ellen Greene, American singer and actress
1952 – Bill Frist, American physician and politician
1952 – Joaquim Pina Moura, Portuguese Minister of Economy and Treasury and MP (d. 2020)
  1952   – Saufatu Sopoanga, Tuvaluan politician, 8th Prime Minister of Tuvalu (d. 2020) 
1953 – Nigel Planer, English actor and screenwriter
1955 – David Axelrod, American journalist and political adviser
  1955   – Tim Young, Canadian ice hockey player
1957 – Willie Smits, Dutch microbiologist and engineer
1958 – Dave Spitz, American bass player and songwriter 
1959 – Jiří Čunek, Czech politician
  1959   – Kyle MacLachlan, American actor
  1959   – Bronwyn Oliver, Australian sculptor (d. 2006)
1960 – Thomas Galbraith, 2nd Baron Strathclyde, Scottish politician, Chancellor of the Duchy of Lancaster
1961 – Akira Takasaki, Japanese guitarist, songwriter, and producer 
1962 – Steve Irwin, Australian zoologist and television host (d. 2006)
1963 – Andrew Adonis, Baron Adonis, English journalist and politician, Secretary of State for Transport
  1963   – Devon Malcolm, Jamaican-English cricketer
  1963   – Vijay Singh, Fijian-American golfer
1964 – Diane Charlemagne, English singer-songwriter (d. 2015)
  1964   – Andy Gray, English footballer and manager
1965 – Kieren Fallon, Irish jockey
1966 – Rachel Dratch, American actress and comedian
1967 – Psicosis II, Mexican wrestler
1968 – Shawn Graham, Canadian politician, 31st Premier of New Brunswick
  1968   – Jeri Ryan, American model and actress
  1968   – Jayson Williams, American basketball player and sportscaster
1969 – Thomas Jane, American actor
  1969   – Brian Laudrup, Danish footballer and sportscaster
  1969   – Marc Wilmots,  Belgian footballer and manager 
1971 – Lea Salonga, Filipino actress and singer
1972 – Michael Chang, American tennis player and coach
  1972   – Claudia Pechstein, German speed skater
  1972   – Haim Revivo, Israeli footballer
 1972 – Ben Sasse, U.S. Senator from Nebraska
1973 – Philippe Gaumont, French cyclist (d. 2013)
  1973   – Juninho Paulista, Brazilian footballer
1974 – James Blunt, English singer-songwriter and guitarist
  1974   – Chris Moyles, English radio and television host
1975 – Drew Barrymore, American actress, director, producer, and screenwriter
1977 – Hakan Yakin, Swiss footballer
1979 – Brett Emerton, Australian footballer
  1979   – Lee Na-young, South Korean actress
1980 – Jeanette Biedermann, German singer-songwriter and actress
1983 – Shaun Tait, Australian cricketer
1984 – Tommy Bowe, Irish rugby player
  1984   – Branislav Ivanović, Serbian footballer
1985 – Hameur Bouazza, Algerian international footballer
  1985   – Georgios Printezis, Greek basketball player
1986 – Rajon Rondo, American basketball player
1987 – Han Hyo-joo, South Korean actress and model
  1987   – Sergio Romero, Argentinian footballer
1988 – Jonathan Borlée, Belgian sprinter
1989 – Franco Vázquez, Argentinian footballer
1991 – Khalil Mack, American football player
1994 – Nam Joo-hyuk, South Korean model and actor

Deaths

Pre-1600
 556 – Maximianus, bishop of Ravenna (b. 499)
 606 – Sabinian, pope of the Catholic Church
 793 – Sicga, Anglo-Saxon nobleman and regicide
 845 – Wang, Chinese empress dowager
 954 – Guo Wei, Chinese emperor (b. 904)
 965 – Otto, duke of Burgundy (b. 944)
 970 – García I, king of Pamplona
 978 – Lambert, count of Chalon (b. 930)
1071 – Arnulf III, count of Flanders
1072 – Peter Damian, Italian cardinal
1079 – John of Fécamp, Italian Benedictine abbot
1111 – Roger Borsa, king of Sicily (b. 1078)
1297 – Margaret of Cortona, Italian penitent (b. 1247)
1371 – David II, king of Scotland (b. 1324)
1452 – William Douglas, 8th Earl of Douglas (b. 1425)
1500 – Gerhard VI, German nobleman (b. 1430)
1511 – Henry, duke of Cornwall (b. 1511)
1512 – Amerigo Vespucci, Italian cartographer and explorer (b. 1454)

1601–1900
1627 – Olivier van Noort, Dutch explorer (b. 1558)
1674 – Jean Chapelain, French poet and critic (b. 1595)
1680 – La Voisin, French occultist (b. 1640)
1690 – Charles Le Brun, French painter and theorist (b. 1619)
1731 – Frederik Ruysch, Dutch physician and anatomist (b. 1638)
1732 – Francis Atterbury, English bishop (b. 1663)
1799 – Heshen, Chinese politician (b. 1750)
1816 – Adam Ferguson, Scottish historian and philosopher (b. 1723)
1875 – Jean-Baptiste-Camille Corot, French painter and illustrator (b. 1796)
  1875   – Charles Lyell, Scottish geologist (b. 1797)
1888 – Anna Kingsford, English physician and activist (b. 1846)
1890 – John Jacob Astor III, American businessman and philanthropist (b. 1822)
  1890   – Carl Bloch, Danish painter and academic (b. 1834)
1897 – Charles Blondin, French tightrope walker and acrobat (b. 1824)
1898 – Heungseon Daewongun, Korean king (b. 1820)

1901–present
1903 – Hugo Wolf, Austrian composer (b. 1860)
1904 – Leslie Stephen, English historian, author, and critic (b. 1832)
1913 – Ferdinand de Saussure, Swiss linguist and author (b. 1857)
  1913   – Francisco I. Madero, Mexican president and author (b. 1873)
1923 – Théophile Delcassé, French politician, French Minister of Foreign Affairs (b. 1852)
1939 – Antonio Machado, Spanish-French poet and author (b. 1875)
1942 – Stefan Zweig, Austrian journalist, author, and playwright (b. 1881)
1943 – Christoph Probst, German activist (b. 1919)
  1943   – Hans Scholl, German activist (b. 1918)
  1943   – Sophie Scholl, German activist (b. 1921)
1944 – Kasturba Gandhi, Indian activist (b. 1869)
 1944    – Fritz Schmenkel, anti-Nazi German who joined Soviet partisans (b.1916) 
1945 – Osip Brik, Russian avant garde writer and literary critic (b. 1888)
1958 – Abul Kalam Azad, Indian scholar and politician, Indian Minister of Education (b. 1888)
1960 – Paul-Émile Borduas, Canadian-French painter and critic (b. 1905)
1961 – Nick LaRocca, American trumpet player and composer (b. 1889)
1965 – Felix Frankfurter, Austrian-American lawyer and jurist (b. 1882)
1971 – Frédéric Mariotti, French actor (b. 1883) 
1973 – Jean-Jacques Bertrand, Canadian lawyer and politician, 21st Premier of Quebec (b. 1916)
  1973   – Elizabeth Bowen, Anglo-Irish author (b. 1899)
  1973   – Katina Paxinou, Greek actress (b. 1900)
  1973   – Winthrop Rockefeller, American colonel and politician, 37th Governor of Arkansas (b. 1912)
1976 – Angela Baddeley, English actress (b. 1904)
  1976   – Florence Ballard, American singer (b. 1943)
1980 – Oskar Kokoschka, Austrian painter, poet and playwright (b. 1886)
1982 – Josh Malihabadi, Indian-Pakistani poet and author (b. 1898)
1983 – Adrian Boult, English conductor (b. 1889)
  1983   – Romain Maes, Belgian cyclist (b. 1913)
1985 – Salvador Espriu, Spanish author, poet, and playwright (b. 1913)
  1985   – Efrem Zimbalist, Russian violinist, composer, and conductor (b. 1889)
1986 – John Donnelly, Australian rugby league player (b. 1955)
1987 – David Susskind, American talk show host and producer (b. 1920)
  1987   – Andy Warhol, American painter and photographer (b. 1928)
1992 – Markos Vafiadis, Greek general and politician (b. 1906)
1994 – Papa John Creach, American violinist (b. 1917)
1995 – Ed Flanders, American actor (b. 1934)
1997 – Joseph Aiuppa, American gangster (b. 1907)
1998 – Abraham A. Ribicoff, American lawyer and politician, 4th United States Secretary of Health and Human Services (b. 1910)
1999 – William Bronk, American poet and academic (b. 1918)
  1999   – Menno Oosting, Dutch tennis player (b. 1964)
2002 – Chuck Jones, American animator, producer, and screenwriter (b. 1912)
  2002   – Jonas Savimbi, Angolan general, founded UNITA (b. 1934)
2004 – Andy Seminick, American baseball player, coach, and manager (b. 1920)
2005 – Lee Eun-ju, South Korean actress and singer (b. 1980)
  2005   – Simone Simon, French actress (b. 1910)
2006 – S. Rajaratnam, Singaporean politician, 1st Senior Minister of Singapore (b. 1915)
2007 – George Jellicoe, 2nd Earl Jellicoe, English politician, Leader of the House of Lords (b. 1918)
  2007   – Dennis Johnson, American basketball player and coach (b. 1954)
2012 – Sukhbir, Indian author and poet (b. 1925)
  2012   – Frank Carson, Irish-English comedian and actor (b. 1926)
  2012   – Marie Colvin, American journalist (b. 1956)
  2012   – Rémi Ochlik, French photographer and journalist (b. 1983)
2013 – Atje Keulen-Deelstra, Dutch speed skater (b. 1938)
  2013   – Jean-Louis Michon, French-Swiss scholar and translator (b. 1924)
  2013   – Wolfgang Sawallisch, German pianist and conductor (b. 1923)
2014 – Charlotte Dawson, New Zealand–Australian television host (b. 1966)
  2014   – Trebor Jay Tichenor, American pianist and composer (b. 1940)
  2014   – Leo Vroman, Dutch-American hematologist, poet, and illustrator (b. 1915)
2015 – Chris Rainbow, Scottish singer-songwriter and producer (b. 1946)
2016 – Yolande Fox, American model and singer, Miss America 1951 (b. 1928)
  2016   – Sonny James, American singer-songwriter and guitarist (b. 1928)
2018 – Forges, Spanish cartoonist (b. 1942)
2019 – Brody Stevens, American comedian and actor (b. 1970)
  2019   – Morgan Woodward, American actor (b. 1925)
2021 – Lawrence Ferlinghetti, American poet, painter (b. 1919)

Holidays and observances
Birthday of Scouting and Guiding founder Robert Baden-Powell and Olave Baden-Powell, and its related observance:
 Founder's Day or "B.-P. day" (World Organization of the Scout Movement)
 World Thinking Day (World Association of Girl Guides and Girl Scouts)
 Christian feast day:
 Baradates
 Eric Liddell (Episcopal Church (USA))
 Feast of the Chair of Saint Peter (Roman Catholic Church)
 Margaret of Cortona
 February 22 (Eastern Orthodox liturgics)
 Crime Victims Day (Europe)
 Independence Day, celebrates the independence of Saint Lucia from the United Kingdom in 1979.
 Founding Day (Saudi Arabia)
 Washington's Birthday, federal holiday in the United States. A holiday on February 22 as well as the third Monday in February.
 National Cat Day (Japan)

References

External links

 BBC: On This Day
 
 Historical Events on February 22

Days of the year
February